Alfred Edward Gilberthorpe (11 December 1885 – 1960) was an English footballer who played in the Football League for Chesterfield Town and Hull City.

References

1885 births
1960 deaths
English footballers
Association football forwards
English Football League players
Chesterfield F.C. players
Hull City A.F.C. players
Bolsover Colliery F.C. players